6th Cavalry, 6th Cavalry Division, 6th Cavalry Brigade or 6th Cavalry Regiment may refer to:

Corps
VI Cavalry Corps (Grande Armée)
VI Cavalry Corps (German Empire)

Division
6th Cavalry Division (German Empire)

Brigades
6th Cavalry Brigade (Australia)
6th Indian Cavalry Brigade
6th Cavalry Brigade (Poland)
6th Cavalry Brigade (United Kingdom)

Regiments and battalions
6th King Edward's Own Cavalry, a former regiment of the Indian Army
6th Cavalry Regiment (United States)
6th Regiment Alabama Cavalry, a Confederate regiment of the American Civil War
6th Arkansas Cavalry Regiment, a Confederate regiment of the American Civil War
6th Arkansas Cavalry Battalion, a Confederate regiment of the American Civil War
6th Regiment Illinois Volunteer Cavalry, a Union regiment of the American Civil War
6th Regiment Indiana Cavalry, a Union regiment of the American Civil War
6th Regiment Iowa Volunteer Cavalry, a Union regiment of the American Civil War
6th Regiment Kansas Volunteer Cavalry, a Union regiment of the American Civil War
6th Regiment Kentucky Volunteer Cavalry, a Union regiment of the American Civil War
6th Michigan Volunteer Cavalry Regiment, a Union regiment of the American Civil War
6th Missouri Volunteer Cavalry, a Union regiment of the American Civil War
6th New York Cavalry Regiment, a Union regiment of the American Civil War
6th Ohio Cavalry, a Union regiment of the American Civil War
6th Pennsylvania Cavalry, a Union regiment of the American Civil War
6th Regiment South Carolina Cavalry, a Confederate regiment of the American Civil War
6th Regiment Tennessee Volunteer Cavalry, a Union regiment of the American Civil War
6th Virginia Cavalry, a Confederate regiment of the American Civil War